Martín Enrique Payares Campo (born 27 March 1995) is a Colombian football player who plays as defender for El Paso Locomotive in the USL Championship.

Career
Payares played with various clubs in his native Colombia between 2014 and 2021, including Cortuluá, Orsomarso, Deportivo Pasto, Santa Fe, Patriotas and Atlético Bucaramanga.

On 21 December 2021, it was announced that Payares had joined USL Championship side El Paso Locomotive for their 2022 season.

References

1995 births
Living people
Association football defenders
Colombian footballers
Categoría Primera A players
Cortuluá footballers
Orsomarso S.C. footballers
Deportivo Pasto footballers
Independiente Santa Fe footballers
Patriotas Boyacá footballers
Atlético Bucaramanga footballers
El Paso Locomotive FC players
Colombian expatriate footballers
Colombian expatriate sportspeople in the United States
Expatriate soccer players in the United States
People from Sucre Department